Killing Me Softly is a studio album by American singer-songwriter Roberta Flack, released on August 1, 1973, by Atlantic Records. She recorded the album with producer Joel Dorn for 18 months. The album was dedicated to Rahsaan Roland Kirk.

Killing Me Softly reached number three on the Billboard Top LPs & Tape and number two on the Soul LPs chart. The Recording Industry Association of America (RIAA) certified the album gold on August 27, 1973, and double platinum on January 30, 2006, denoting shipments of two million copies in the United States. It was nominated for a Grammy Award for Album of the Year, which it lost to Stevie Wonder's 1973 album Innervisions. The album's title track was released as a single and topped the Billboard Hot 100. It won the 1974 Grammy Award for Record of the Year.

Critical reception 
Reviewing for the Chicago Tribune in September 1973, Clarence Page said Killing Me Softly has a hit title track and "other potential hits, adding up to one of [Flack's] better albums". John S. Wilson, writing in The New York Times, felt that Flack and producer Joel Dorn "have resisted the pitfalls of overproducing that you would suppose such a long gestation period would induce". Billboard called the record a "delicate, introspective work" by Flack, whom the magazine deemed a "masterful interpreter of clean lyrics fusing a sophisticated pop sound with that dark side of the blues".

Robert Christgau was less impressed in a December 1973 column for Creem, giving Killing Me Softly a "C" while comparing Flack negatively to Jesse Colin Young because she also "always makes you wonder whether she's going to fall asleep before you do". In a retrospective review, The Rolling Stone Album Guide (1992) gave the record two-and-a-half out of five stars and found its music "innocuous". AllMusic's Ron Wynn later gave it four and a half stars, writing that the album "continued in the same tradition as Chapter Two and Quiet Fire", featuring "simmering ballads, declarative message songs, and better-than-average up-tempo numbers".

Track listing
 "Killing Me Softly with His Song" (Charles Fox, Norman Gimbel) - 4:49
 "Jesse" (Janis Ian) - 4:03
 "No Tears (In the End)" (Ralph MacDonald, William Salter) - 4:56
 "I'm the Girl" (James Alan Shelton) - 4:55
 "River" (Gene McDaniels) - 5:03
 "Conversation Love" (Terry Plumeri, Bill Seighman) - 3:43
 "When You Smile" (Ralph MacDonald, William Salter) - 3:44
 "Suzanne" (Leonard Cohen) - 9:44

Personnel 
Credits are adapted from AllMusic.

 Roberta Flack – vocals, pianos, rhythm track arrangements 
 Eric Gale – guitars
 Ron Carter – bass
 Grady Tate – drums
 Ralph MacDonald – congas, percussion, tambourine
 Kermit Moore – cello (4), cello arrangements (4)
 Eumir Deodato – string arrangements and conductor (2, 8)
 Alfred "Pee Wee" Ellis – brass arrangements and conductor (3)
 William Eaton – horn arrangements (5, 7)
 Don Sebesky – horn and string arrangements (6), conductor (6)

Production
 Joel Dorn – producer
 Jack Shaw – associate producer
 Gene Paul – engineer and remix (1)
 Bob Liftin – engineer and remix (2-8)
 Barry Diament – mastering
 Shorewood Graphics – design concept 
 Rod Dyer – design
 Burt Goldblatt – backliner photography
 David Redfern – inside photography

Charts

Certifications

References

External links 
 

Roberta Flack albums
1973 albums
Albums arranged by Don Sebesky
Albums arranged by Eumir Deodato
Albums produced by Joel Dorn
Atlantic Records albums